This article deals with current phonology and phonetics and with historical developments of the phonology of the Tagalog language, including variants.

Tagalog has allophones, so it is important here to distinguish phonemes (written in slashes / /) and corresponding allophones (written in brackets [ ]).

Consonants

Vowels and semivowels

Stress and final glottal stop
Stress is a distinctive feature in Tagalog. Primary stress occurs on either the final or the penultimate syllable of a word. Vowel lengthening accompanies primary or secondary stress except when stress occurs at the end of a word.

Tagalog words are often distinguished from one another by the position of the stress and/or the presence of a final glottal stop. In formal or academic settings, stress placement and the glottal stop are indicated by a diacritic (tuldík) above the final vowel. The penultimate primary stress position (malumay) is the default stress type and so is left unwritten except in dictionaries. The name of each stress type has its corresponding diacritic in the final vowel.

See also
 Tagalog orthography
 Help:IPA/Tagalog

References

Phonology
Austronesian phonologies